Krishna Cottage is a 2004 Indian Hindi horror film directed by Santram Varma. It was produced by the mother-daughter team of Ekta Kapoor and Shobha Kapoor, better known for producing Indian television soap operas. It starred Sohail Khan, Isha Koppikar and Anita Hassanandani in the leading roles. Upon release, it received mixed reviews and was a box office failure. However, it has become a cult classic over the years for its story and screenplay.

Plot
The film opens at a function celebrating the launch of a book by Professor Siddharth Das (Rajendranath Zutshi). The professor donates a copy of the book to JC College. The college principal removes the book from the library and places it in an abandoned storeroom.

A group of close college friends all attend JC College: Manav (Sohail Khan), Shanti (Anita Hassanandani), Kabir (Ali Hassan), Akshay (Hiten Tejwani), Nupur (Divya Palat) and Talli (Vrajesh Hirjee). Manav is engaged to Shanti,  who is a sweet but somewhat possessive girlfriend. Disha (Isha Koppikar), a charming girl, arrives and joins the college, and although Manav loves Shanti, he finds himself strangely drawn towards Disha. Disha gradually gets close to Manav, which perturbs Shanti. Manav explains that he feels strangely protective of Disha but that his real love is Shanti.

Strange telekinetic events transpire at Manav and Shanti's engagement, one of which nearly kills Disha. When the group drives Disha home, their car breaks down and they are forced to spend the night at an old halfway house: Krishna Cottage. The peculiar events intensify at Krishna Cottage, and two of the friends are nearly killed. Disha explains that the spirit of her dead boyfriend, Amar Khanna, is the one causing these supernatural occurrences. One day, Nupur reads Professor Siddharth Das's book and discovers that the book exposes something about Amar Khanna. Before she can reveal it, she is murdered by a mysterious force.

Talli overhears a conversation between Professor Siddharth Das and the college principal. The professor explains that the book is jinxed and cautions that it must be destroyed. Kabir reads the book and is murdered. Shanti meets Disha's mother, who reveals Disha has been dead for 22 years. Stunned, Shanti flees and is pursued by Disha's spirit. She faints and awakens at the home of a noted medium, Sunita Menon (Rati Agnihotri). Sunita performs a seance that invokes Disha's spirit. The spirit angrily exclaims its quest for the death.

Talli reads the book and learns that it is all about Krishna Cottage, but is murdered by Disha. Professor Das, who was in love with Disha burns the last few pages of the book and reminisces about Disha but he dies of heart attack before Manav and others could reach him . Manav discovers a body preserved in ice. The body bears an uncanny similarity to him; this brings back a flood of visions: Manav was in fact, Amar Khanna in his previous birth. He and Disha were students of JC College many years ago. Disha was madly in love with him, but he turned her down because he thought of her as a friend. Angry, Disha committed murders and tells Amar to escape (with her) as Police will frame Amar for the murder. However, later Amar found the murder weapon in Disha's car. Amar tells her to stop the car but she resists and  crashes the car into the side of a mountain, in which amar is thrown out of car and dies instantly,heartbroken disha takes him in her arms and refuses to let go ,an avalanche starts and the professor and the principal reach the site and wave to her to come back but she stays with amar's dead body and chooses to be killed by the avalanche . Disha has now returned as a spirit to reclaim her lost love.

Sunita suggests the only way to stop Disha: Manav and Shanti must be married, as this bond is too strong for a spirit to break. The wedding ceremony commences that night, and Disha's spirit attacks, throwing Sunita up, in the air and she falls down on a tree branch which impales her belly, killing her. Manav then agrees to go with Disha's spirit, but says that while the spirit may claim his body, his heart belongs to his wife Shanti and he is fortunate to die for her; his true love amd jumps to his death,disha takes him in her arms.Manav wakes in a nearby cottage, surprised to be alive and is told  by the caretaker that a woman dropped him there.He reads a letter by disha that appeared on the window stating that she couldn't let his love become immortal,as her love is immortal and she understood that his happiness lies with shanti and the meaning of love is to give ,not take. She wishes him a beautiful life and that she will always be with him ; not like a negative shadow but like fresh rays of sun shining on his face .Manav and shanti live a happy married life .

Cast
 Sohail Khan as Manav / Amar Khanna
 Isha Koppikar as Disha
 Anita Hassanandani as Shanti (credited as "Natassha" in film credits)
 Rati Agnihotri as Sunita Menon
 Vrajesh Hirjee as Puneet "Talli" Kumar
 Divya Palat as Nupur
 Hiten Tejwani as Akshay
 Ali Hassan as Kabir 
 Rajendranath Zutshi as Professor Siddharth Das
 Rajendra Gupta as J.C. College's Principal
 Usha Nadkarni as Disha's mom

Track list
The film's soundtrack contains 7 songs composed by Anu Malik and Vishal–Shekhar (for Hameesha Tere Saath). Lyrics were penned by Sanjay Chhel, Neelesh Mishra, Sameer and Shekhar Ravjiani. The album was released on 2 April 2004.

See also
 List of Bollywood horror films

External links 
 

2004 films
2000s Hindi-language films
Films shot in Uttarakhand
2004 horror films
Films scored by Anu Malik
Films scored by Vishal–Shekhar
Indian ghost films
Indian romantic thriller films
Indian romantic horror films
Balaji Motion Pictures films
2000s romantic thriller films
Films shot in Mussoorie